Promise Osazee Omochere (born 18 October 2000) is an Irish professional football player who plays as a forward for English League One club Fleetwood Town.

Career

Bohemians
Omochere joined the Bohemians senior team in 2018 after spending time with their academy. He scored his first league goal for the club in May 2021 in a 5–1 victory against Dundalk.

Fleetwood Town
On 21 July 2022, Omochere joined League One club Fleetwood Town for an undisclosed fee on a three-year deal.

Personal life
Omochere studied business and law at Maynooth University.

Career statistics

References

2000 births
Living people
Republic of Ireland association footballers
Association football forwards
Bohemian F.C. players
Fleetwood Town F.C. players
League of Ireland players
English Football League players
Republic of Ireland expatriate association footballers
Irish expatriates in England
Expatriate footballers in England